Tamara Vasilyevna Pletnyova (née Shtrak, born November 22, 1947,  Novodubrovskoe, Novosibirsk Oblast, RSFSR, USSR) is a Russian politician.

Deputy of the State Duma of the first (1993–1995), the second (1995–1999), the third (1999–2003), the fourth (2003–2007), the fifth (2007–2011), the sixth (2011–2016) and seventh convocations (2016-2021), a member of the Communist Party faction, member of the Permanent Commission of the CIS Interparliamentary Assembly on social policy and human rights and the chairwoman of the Family, Women, and Children Affairs Committee in the State Duma.

In March 2019, Pletnyova has called gays "sick" people who "must be cured".

In 2020, Pletnyova called for a law that would tax on childless couples.(Russia used to have that tax from 1941-1990).

References

External links 
 Политическая партия «Коммунистическая партия Российской Федерации»
 Государственная Дума Федерального Собрания Российской Федерации

1947 births
Living people
Recipients of the Order of Honour (Russia)
Communist Party of the Russian Federation members
20th-century Russian women politicians
20th-century Russian politicians
21st-century Russian women politicians
First convocation members of the State Duma (Russian Federation)
Second convocation members of the State Duma (Russian Federation)
Third convocation members of the State Duma (Russian Federation)
Fourth convocation members of the State Duma (Russian Federation)
Fifth convocation members of the State Duma (Russian Federation)
Sixth convocation members of the State Duma (Russian Federation)
Seventh convocation members of the State Duma (Russian Federation)